Berlin (A1411) is the lead ship of the s of the German Navy. The vessel was constructed by Flensburger Schiffbau-Gesellschaft in Hamburg, Germany and launched on 30 April 1999. Berlin was commissioned on 11 April 2001 and remains in service. The ship is primarily used to replenish stores and supplies of German overseas fleets.

Development 

The Berlin-class replenishment ships are the largest vessels of the German Navy. In German, this type of ship is called Einsatzgruppenversorger which can be translated as "task force supplier" though the official translation in English is "combat support ship". 

They are intended to support German naval units away from their home ports. The ships carry fuel, provisions, ammunition and other matériel and also provide medical services. The ships are named after German cities where German parliaments were placed.

Construction and career 
Berlin was launched on 30 April 1999 in Hamburg, Germany. She was commissioned on 11 April 2001.

In 2016, an overloaded boat sank in the night of between 18 and 19 April, costing the lives of up to 800 migrants. The European Council decision and a parliamentary green light, the German Navy dispatched the frigate  and Berlin to provide a presence north of Libyan territorial waters. Both ships were operating off the Horn of Africa to provide the German Navy with an operational reserve. Hessen and Berlin joined many other European Union vessels, which ranged from warships to auxiliary and coast guard ships to form EU NAVFOR MEDL.

The  conducted a boarding exercise aboard Berlin during Baltic Operations (BALTOPS) 2019.

Gallery

References 

Berlin-class replenishment ships
1999 ships
Ships built in Hamburg